Witness Insecurity may refer to:
 Witness Insecurity (film), a 2011 American film
 Witness Insecurity (TV series), a 2012 Hong Kong TV series